Cade Stover is an American football tight end for the Ohio State Buckeyes.

Early life and high school career
Stover grew up in Mansfield, Ohio and attended Lexington High School. He was named Ohio's Mr. Football and the Ohio Gatorade Player of the Year as a senior after rushing for 1,477 yards and 17 touchdowns on offense and recording 163 tackles and four interceptions on defense. Stover also set Lexington's all-time scoring record in basketball. He was rated a four-star recruit and committed to play college football at Ohio State over offers from Michigan, Oklahoma, Penn State, Texas, and Wisconsin.

College career
Stover was initially recruited to play linebacker at Ohio State, but was moved to defensive end before the start of his freshman season. He played in four games before redshirting the season. Stover was moved to tight end during spring practice in 2020. He returned back to linebacker during the season. Stover was again moved to tight end for his redshirt junior season and caught five passes for 76 yards. He played linebacker in the 2022 Rose Bowl due to a shortage of players at the position.

References

External links
Ohio State Buckeyes bio

Living people
American football tight ends
Ohio State Buckeyes football players
Players of American football from Ohio
Year of birth missing (living people)